is a Japanese chef, entertainer, and representative of Unity Magenta who is represented by Horipro.

Filmography

Series

Television

Drama

Anime

Radio

Advertisements

Magazines

Photo-books

Trading cards

DVD

References

External links
 

1979 births
Living people
People from Sakai, Osaka
Japanese chefs
Japanese television personalities
Horipro artists